Jaghin (also Romanized as Jaghīn) is a village in Jaghin-e Shomali Rural District, Jaghin District, Rudan County, Hormozgan Province, Iran. At the 2006 census, its population was 491, in 105 families.

References 

Populated places in Rudan County